David John Duncan (30 June 1933 – 29 October 2018) was an award-winning Scottish Canadian fantasy and science fiction author.

Biography

Duncan was born in Newport-on-Tay, Scotland and was educated at the High School of Dundee before studying geology at the University of St Andrews. After graduating in 1955, he moved to Calgary, Alberta, becoming a Canadian citizen in 1960. He pursued a career as a geologist in the petroleum industry for nearly three decades before he started writing science fiction and fantasy novels.  He made his first sale (A Rose Red City) two years later in 1986 at the age of 53, just two weeks after his 31-year career as a geologist came to an end due to a slump in the oil business, at which point he switched to full-time writing.

Duncan lived in Victoria, British Columbia. His wife was Janet, whom he married in 1959, and they had one son, two daughters, and four grandchildren. He had one brother, Michael, who was an agriculturist.

Duncan died on 29 October 2018 at the age of 85.

Writing career

Duncan was a prolific writer and penned over fifty books.
His sixth book, West of January, won the 1990 Aurora award, an award he would win again in 2007 for Children of Chaos.
He was a member of SF Canada and in 2015 he was inducted into the Canadian Science Fiction and Fantasy Hall of Fame.

Although Duncan usually wrote under his own name, some of his early books were published under the pseudonyms Ken Hood and Sarah B. Franklin.

Bibliography

The Seventh Sword

A dying young man named Wallie Smith is transferred from Earth into the body of a master swordsman in a pre-technological world by its gods for their own purposes.
The Reluctant Swordsman (1988), 
The Coming of Wisdom (1988), 
The Destiny of the Sword (1988), 
The Death of Nnanji (2012),

Pandemia

A Man of His Word
 Magic Casement (1990), 
 Faery Lands Forlorn (1991), 
 Perilous Seas (1991), 
 Emperor and Clown (1992), 

As mentioned in the forewords, these titles are based on an excerpt from the 1819 poem "Ode to a Nightingale" by John Keats.

The voice I hear this passing night was heard
In ancient days by emperor and clown:
Perhaps the self-same song that found a path
Through the sad heart of Ruth, when sick for home,
She stood in tears amid the alien corn;
The same that oft-times hath
Charm'd magic casements, opening on the foam
Of perilous seas, in faery lands forlorn.

A Handful of Men
 The Cutting Edge (1992), 
 Upland Outlaws (1993), 
 The Stricken Field (1993), 
 The Living God (1994),

Omar
The Reaver Road (1992), 
The Hunters' Haunt (1995),

The Great Game
Past Imperative (1995), 
Present Tense (1996), 
Future Indefinite (1997),

The Years of Longdirk
Published using the pseudonym Ken Hood:
Demon Sword (1995), 
Demon Rider (1997), 
Demon Knight (1998),

The King's Blades

Tales of the King's Blades
The Gilded Chain (1998), 
Lord of the Fire Lands (1999), 
Sky of Swords (2000),

Chronicles of the King's Blades
Paragon Lost (2002), 
Impossible Odds (2003), 
The Jaguar Knights (2004), 
One Velvet Glove (2017), 
The Ethical Swordsman (2019),

The King's Daggers
A series of young adult books set in the "King's Blades" world:
Sir Stalwart (1999), 
The Crooked House (2000), 
Silvercloak (2001), 
Omnibus edition of all three is titled The Monster War,

Dodec
Children of Chaos (2006), 
Mother of Lies (2007),

Nostradamus
The Alchemist's Apprentice (2007), 
The Alchemist's Code (2008), 
The Alchemist's Pursuit (2009),

Brothers Magnus
Speak to the Devil (2010), 
When the Saints (2011),

The Starfolk
King of Swords (2013), 
Queen of Stars (2014),

Ivor of Glenbroch
A series of young adult short stories:
The Runner and the Wizard (2013), 
The Runner and the Saint (2014), 
The Runner and the Kelpie (2014), 
Omnibus edition of all three is titled The Adventures of Ivor,

The Enchanter General
Ironfoot (2017)
Trial by Treason (2018)
Merlin Redux (2019)

Standalone novels
A Rose-Red City (1987), 
Shadow (1987), 
West of January (1989), 
Strings (1990), 
Hero! (1991), 
The Cursed (1995), 
Daughter of Troy (1998), (as Sarah B. Franklin), 
Ill Met in the Arena (August 2008), 
Pock's World (October 2010), 
Against the Light (January 2012), 
Wildcatter (August 2012), 
The Eye of Strife (April 2015), 
Irona 700 (August 2015), 
Eocene Station (August 2016), 
Portal of a Thousand Worlds (February 2017), 
Pillar of Darkness (January 2019),

References

External links

1933 births
2018 deaths
People educated at the High School of Dundee
Alumni of the University of St Andrews
Scottish fantasy writers
Canadian fantasy writers
Scottish emigrants to Canada
Scottish science fiction writers
Canadian science fiction writers
Writers from Victoria, British Columbia
British male novelists